Jonny Blu is a singer/songwriter who was born and raised in Los Angeles but made his professional debut in China. He entered the music scene in Hong Kong and became the first Caucasian pop star in the Chinese music world.

From his first Mandarin Chinese Pop album Jonny Blu-On the Edge|藍強-刀鋒, his songs "On The Edge|刀鋒", "Crossroads|十子路口", and "The Apology|對不起妳" were Top Ten hits in the Chinese Music and Music Video charts. With a style similar to that of Michael Bublé, Harry Connick Jr. and Jamie Cullum, in December 2006, he released his debut swing/pop album In Just That Kind of a Mood.

In June 2008, he released an EP titled In a Groove, co-produced with Myke Aaron. On September 8, 2009, Blu released his album Taboo!, produced by Peer Music, with arrangements by Bob Malone.

Early life and musical beginnings
Blu was raised by his mother in Los Angeles. His father, Reuben Klamer (known for creating The Game of Life), lived in Marina Del Rey. When he was three years old, his parents divorced. He attended Sinai Academy in Beverly Hills, California. He displayed musical talent at an early age, having been in select vocals groups in early schooling. His mother, Shary Klamer, an actress and trained singer, taught him his basics of singing and piano. At age 10 he attended El Rodeo public school in Beverly Hills and began attending Beverly Hills High School at age 13. He began studying martial arts at age six. His musical influences came from Harry Connick Jr., Sting, Billy Joel, Elton John, and George Michael. He enjoyed entertaining whoever was around with his renditions of songs such as "We Are In Love", "Faith" and "Your Song".

After college
President Bill Clinton was on a visit to China when Blu was at Peking University. A White House official contacted the EAP Program to ask about hiring non-Chinese Americans as translators. Blu and a friend, the only non-Chinese Americans who were fluent in Chinese, were chosen. After returning to the US, Blu worked part-time for the Office of White House Advance, organizing events and motorcade for President Clinton and Vice President Al Gore. He also worked for Soviet Union President Mikhail Gorbachev as a personal escort for three days at a Global Green USA Convention in 2000.

Music career

The China pop years

The Chinese Singing Competition
In 2000, after returning from studying in China and graduating from UCLA, Blu was in a Monterey Park, California, music store buying Chinese pop music. On a whim, he noticed a sign-up sheet for a Chinese singing competition and he filled out the form (in Chinese) and returned it to the store manager. As the only non-Chinese contestant, Blu stunned the audience and judges with his rendition of the hit Chinese pop song "Xin Tai Ruan (心太軟)". He won and was approached afterward by an executive at the Taiwanese Television network ETTV America (part of Dong Sen Television Network, Taiwan). Through ETTV, Blu entered several other Chinese singing competitions and was a finalist in the International Finals of the CCTV Singing Competition, which took place in Arcadia, California, at The Arboretum.

Hong Kong
In 2001, intending to work with music manager Clarence Hui (許愿), Blu moved to Hong Kong. He used the Chinese name 藍強 (pronounced "Lan Qiang", meaning "Blue Strength"). After struggling for over two years performing in bars and clubs around Hong Kong and getting a couple small television commercials, he went to a meeting with Richard Denekamp, the head of Sony Music Asia. Denekamp was impressed by Blu and his preliminary recordings of his original Mandarin Chinese pop songs, and he was ready to sign Blu to a Sony Asia contract.

The first Caucasian Chinese pop star
In 2003, after signing with See Music|漢星音樂 (a subsidiary of See Corporation, Hong Kong) his career took off. He signed a five-year contract with See Music. In Hong Kong, Blu is affectionately referred to as Xiao Lan (小藍 literally meaning Little Blue). He has had two more follow up songs "Crossroads" (十子路口) and "The Apology" (對不起妳),  which have reached the Top Ten in most Chinese Music charts.

Princess Diaries 2
During a holiday in Oahu, Hawaii, he met film director Garry Marshall. After discussion about a role in an upcoming film, he and Marshall met a few months later at Henderson Productions in Toluca Lake, California. Blu appeared as himself in the garden party scene of The Princess Diaries 2: Royal Engagement, singing a Mandarin Chinese version of the song "Miracles Happen" (originally sung in English by Myra in the film The Princess Diaries). Marshall and the music supervisor for the film, Dawn Soler, liked Blu's song so much that it ended up on The Princess Diaries 2 soundtrack and earned Blu a RIAA Certified Gold Record, with over 700,000 units sold.

Jazz
In 2005, Blu began work on an album in Los Angeles, recording swing and jazz songs that he had written, along with some classic standards that were favorites of his. Influenced by Harry Connick Jr. in his early life (and Elvis Presley, Dean Martin and Brian Setzer), Blu recorded his In Just That Kind of a Mood. After finding licensing for some of his songs, including "In Just That Kind of a Mood" and "Ooh-Wee" which were heard on The Young and the Restless in 2007 and 2008, he moved back to the United States. His album was released in Eastern Europe by Universal Music Group (2008). He released the EP In a Groove (2008).

Blu has performed at the Catalina Jazz Club in Hollywood, Vibrato Jazz Club in Bel Air, California; Iridium Jazz Club in New York, Anthology and Tango Del Rey in San Diego, The Skokie Theater in Chicago, and SoHo Music Club in Santa Barbara, California. His album Taboo! was released in October 2009. His first promotional shows were in New York on September 12, 2009, at Iridium Jazz Club in New York City and on December 15, 2009, at Herb Alpert's Vibrato Jazz Club in Los Angeles.

Discography

Albums

Filmography

Awards

Charts

References

External links
 

Songwriters from California
American jazz musicians
Peking University alumni
University of California, Los Angeles alumni
Living people
Musicians from Los Angeles
Beverly Hills High School alumni
Jazz musicians from California
Year of birth missing (living people)